Aïda Ballmann is a Spanish actress, director and producer from the Canary Islands. She was born on the island El Hierro, of German descent (both parents); she speaks fluent German, Spanish, and English.

Education
She studied Dramatic Art in Gijón and finished her degree in Seville in 2009. In addition she trained in Meisner technique (in Germany and Spain), amongst others.

Career
Her first works in theater were with the companies La Sonrisa del Lagarto, Fauna y Arte and La Carbonería de la Lola, with which she participated in more than twelve productions.

She also worked as a stunt, which led her to participate in the productions El Oro del Rin and La Valquiria of La Fura dels Baus.

In 2012 she starred her first feature film The Extraordinary Tale, by J.F. Ortuño and Laura Alvea, shot in English, for which she was awarded best actress at the Cardiff Independent Film Festival  and at Film Bizarro,  nominated best actress at the Andalusian Film Awards (ASECAN)  and reviewed in magazines such as Hollywood Reporter.

Shortly after, she was awarded best actress at the Festivalito  for Perséfone and received the Leoncio Morales Award for her contribution to the culture of her native island.

She participated in Spanish series such as “Lo que Escondían sus Ojos”, “El Tiempo entre Costuras", “Águila Roja", “Brigada de Fenómenos"  and "Malviviendo"  and starred in various Spanish and international feature films. Among them: “La Velocidad de nuestros Pensamientos”  by Nacho Chueca, the German production “Die Insel”  by Lars Ostmann, “El Gigante y la Sirena”  by Roberto Chinet, “Atlánticas”  by Guillermo García López, “The Europeans”  by Víctor García León or “Gleich”  by Jeniffer Castañeda.

Of her short films, “Five Minutes”  by Genesis Lence stands out. Its world premiere was at the Short Film Corner section of the 74th Cannes Film Festival. She co-starred it with her sister Serai Ballmann.

Her debut as a director and Producer was with the documentary “Sand Path", screened at more than forty festivals, in which she talks about interculturality.

Filmography

TV credits

Theater

References

External links 
 https://aidaballmann.com/es/inicio/ (Official Website)

Living people
Year of birth missing (living people)
Spanish actresses
Spanish people of German descent